Kavvadias is a Greek surname. Notable people with this name include: 

 Epameinondas Kavvadias (1886–1965), admiral of the Hellenic Navy
 Nikos Kavvadias (1910–1975), poet
 Panagiotis Kavvadias (1850–1928), archaeologist
 Alexander Polycleitos Cawadias (1884–1971), physician and son of Panagiotis Kavvadias — generally used the spelling Cawadias in English.

Greek-language surnames